David Erskine may refer to:

David Erskine, 2nd Lord Cardross (1627–1671)
David Erskine, Lord Dun (1670–1758)
David Erskine, 11th Earl of Buchan (1742–1829), Scottish eccentric
David Erskine (dramatist) (1772–1837)
David Erskine, 2nd Baron Erskine (1776–1855), British diplomat and peer
David Erskine, 13th Earl of Buchan, army officer and jockey
David Charles Erskine (1866–1922), British Member of Parliament for West Perthshire, 1906–1910
David Erskine (rugby union) (born 1969), former Irish international rugby union player